Lume may refer to:

 Lume, phosphorescent dial paint

Places
 Lumë, a village in Albania
 Lumë (region), a region between Albania and Kosovo
 Lume (woreda), a woreda in the Oromia Region of Ethiopia
 Lume, a fictional island in The Riddles of Epsilon

See also
 Lumes, a commune in the Ardennes of northern France
 Pedra de Lume, a village in the Cape Verdes Islands
 Ville-sur-Lumes, a commune in the Ardennes of northern France
 Media Centre Lume, national audiovisual centre at Helsinki, Finland
 skyglow, the glow above a city at night